Eusebio Guilarte Mole (15 October 1805 – 11 June 1849) was a Bolivian military officer and statesman who served as the tenth president of Bolivia from 1847 to 1848.

Biography 
A career military officer (not an uncommon choice at the time), Guilarte had fought under Andrés de Santa Cruz at Zepita, and also in the battles of the War of the Confederation (Yanacocha and Uchumayo, among others). He had been José Ballivián's deputy aide at the Battle of Ingavi, for which he was rewarded as Ambassador to Brazil.

Later, the President recalled Guilarte and appointed him a member of the powerful Council of State. Unable to sustain himself in power, in light of the vast conspiracies of Manuel Belzu, Ballivián chose to leave the country and, in late 1847, turned over power to General Guilarte.

President 
As head of the Council of State, Guilarte succeeded Ballivián. By then the die was cast, as Belzu and his supporters were closing in on the capital. Guilarte's investiture simply provided cover for the president to get away while he could. Guilarte attempted to reach an understanding with the rebels, but was overthrown by Belzu in less than two weeks. 

Allowed to live under house arrest in internal exile at the Pacific port of Cobija, Litoral, Guilarte was assassinated less than two years later after attempting to stage a coup, in 1849. After one of his own officers gave away the plot, Guilarte was executed by orders of the military governor of the region, who was allied to Belzu.

References

1805 births
1849 deaths
19th-century Bolivian politicians
Ambassadors of Bolivia to Brazil
Assassinated Bolivian politicians
Bolivian generals
Defense ministers of Bolivia
Guilarte administration cabinet members
José Ballivián administration cabinet members
Leaders ousted by a coup
People from La Paz
People murdered in Bolivia
People of the War of the Confederation
Presidents of Bolivia
1849 murders in South America
19th-century murders in Bolivia